Anthony Michael Ruivivar (born ) is an American actor. He is known for playing Carlos Nieto on Third Watch and Alex Longshadow on Banshee. He also voiced Batman on Beware the Batman.

Early life and education
Ruivivar was born in Honolulu, Hawaii, to a musician father of Filipino, Chinese and Spanish descent, while his mother is of German and Scottish descent.

Career

Ruivivar's early appearances include the films Race the Sun (1996) and a minor character in Starship Troopers (1997). Ruivivar's breakthrough role came in 1999 as Carlos Nieto, a paramedic in the action/drama series Third Watch (1999–2005), which centers around the life of police officers, paramedics, and firemen of a fictional precinct and fire station in New York City. In the show, Carlos was a Hawaiian-born Filipino-American who was abandoned by his family and spent his youth in various foster homes. 

After Third Watch, Ruivivar remained in the drama genre, usually playing a police officer, detective or FBI agent in shows such as Traveler, Quantico, Numb3rs, Criminal Minds, CSI: Crime Scene Investigation (all 2007)  and Lie to Me (2009).

In 2010, he had a main role in ABC's The Whole Truth as Alejo Salazar. He also had recurring roles as Alex Longshadow in Banshee and Bruce Wayne / Batman in Beware the Batman.

Personal life
In January 1998, he married actress Yvonne Jung, who would later appear in seasons 5 and 6 (2003–05) of Third Watch as FDNY EMS Paramedic Holly Levine. In the show, Ruivivar and Jung's characters became a couple and got married in the series finale. They have 3 children; two sons, Kainoa and Kale,  and a daughter, Levi, who is a member of the US Junior Women's Gymnastics national team.

He is fluent in Spanish and has incorporated this in Third Watch. He has a Bachelor of Fine Arts degree from Boston University.

Filmography

Film

Television

Video games

References

External links

1970 births
Living people
American male film actors
American male television actors
American male voice actors
Boston University College of Fine Arts alumni
Male actors from Honolulu
American male actors of Filipino descent
American people of Spanish descent
American people of German descent
American people of Scottish descent
Hawaii people of Chinese descent
Hawaii people of Filipino descent
Hispanic and Latino American male actors